Winfried Nachtwei (born 15 April 1946 in Wulfen) is a German politician and former member of Alliance '90/The Greens in the Bundestag. He is an expert on the Afghanistan conflict and works as a peace and conflict consultant since leaving the Bundestag. His nickname is "Winni".

Political career
Nachtwei was a member of the Communist League of West Germany (Kommunistischer Bund Westdeutschland; KBW) in the 1970s.

Nachtwei first became a member of the German Bundestag in the 1994 elections, representing the electoral district of Münster. Throughout his time in parliament, he was a member of the Defence Committee.

In addition to his committee assignments, Nachtwei served as member of the Parliamentary Friendship Group for Relations with the SADC States; the Parliamentary Friendship Group for Relations with the Baltic States; and the German-Belarusian Parliamentary Friendship Group.

Nachtwei did not run for office again in the 2009 elections.

Other activities
 CARE Deutschland-Luxemburg, Member of the Board of Trustees
 Center for International Peace Operations (ZIF), Member of the Supervisory Board (until 2009)
 Gegen Vergessen – Für Demokratie, Member of the Board
 Heinrich Böll Foundation, Member of the Europe/Transatlantic Advisory Board
 Internationales Bildungs- und Begegnungswerk, Member of the Board of Trustees
 Education and Science Workers' Union (GEW), Member

Works
 Namibia : Von der antikolonialen Revolte zum nationalen Befreiungskampf; Geschichte der ehemaligen deutschen Kolonie Südwestafrikas, Mannheim: Sendler, 1976 (Book series Nationale Befreiung; 7)

References

External links

 Official Website 

1946 births
Living people
People from Dorsten
Communist League of West Germany politicians
Members of the Bundestag for North Rhine-Westphalia
Recipients of the Cross of the Order of Merit of the Federal Republic of Germany
Members of the Bundestag 2005–2009
Members of the Bundestag 2002–2005
Members of the Bundestag 1994–1998
Members of the Bundestag for Alliance 90/The Greens